Alto Palermo S.A. (APSA) is an Argentine real estate company whose fundamental commercial objectives are the possession, development, administration, acquisition and construction of productive shopping centers. APSA is a subsidiary of Inversiones y Representaciones S.A., a real estate holding company based in Buenos Aires, Argentina.

Performance and developments during 2006
During the 2006 fiscal year, APSA's sales grew by 34% in nominal values and occupancy rates were close to 100%. As a result of the favorable conditions prevailing in the sector, APSA entered into a purchase agreement subject to due diligence to acquire Córdoba Shopping. Located in the Villa Cabrera neighborhood in Córdoba City. Córdoba Shopping has a total surface area of 35,000 square meters with 160 retail stores, 12 movie theaters and parking space for 1,500 vehicles. APSA also acquired an undeveloped parcel of land to build a shopping center in the Saavedra neighborhood of Buenos Aires and began implementing major improvements in Shopping Mendoza Plaza, which it started to manage in 2005.

Notes

External links
 Alto Palermo S.A. website

Real estate companies of Argentina